KQRP-LP (92.9 FM) is a radio station broadcasting a 24-hour Spanish Christian format, licensed to Malakoff, Texas, United States. The station serves Cedar Creek Lake and the western side of Henderson County.

References

External links
 

QRP-LP
QRP-LP
Radio stations established in 2015
2015 establishments in Texas